The 2012–13 Grand Prix of Figure Skating Final was an international figure skating competition in the 2012–13 season, held together with the ISU Junior Grand Prix Final. The combined event was the culmination of two international series — the 2012–13 ISU Grand Prix of Figure Skating for senior-level skaters and the 2012–13 ISU Junior Grand Prix for juniors.

The event was held at the Iceberg Skating Palace in Sochi, Russia from 6–9 December 2012. It was a test event in anticipation of the 2014 Winter Olympics in Sochi. Medals were awarded in the disciplines of men's singles, ladies' singles, pair skating, and ice dancing on the senior and junior levels.

Medalists

Senior

Junior

Qualifiers

Senior-level qualifiers
Skaters who reached the age of 14 by July 1, 2012 were eligible to compete at two senior 2012–13 Grand Prix events, including the 2012 Skate America, 2012 Skate Canada International, 2012 Cup of China, 2012 Cup of Russia, 2012 Trophée Eric Bompard, and 2012 NHK Trophy. They earned points at these events and the six highest ranking skaters in each discipline qualified for the senior Grand Prix Final. Yulia Lipnitskaya withdrew due to a concussion and was replaced by first alternate Christina Gao.

Junior-level qualifiers
Skaters who reached the age of 13 by July 1, 2012 but had not turned 19 (singles and females of the other two disciplines) or 21 (male pair skaters and ice dancers) were eligible to compete at two 2012–13 Junior Grand Prix events. They earned points at these events and the six highest-ranking skaters in each discipline qualified for the Junior Grand Prix Final.

Overview
T = Toe loop, S = Salchow, A = Axel

Senior event
Japan's Daisuke Takahashi was first in the men's short program, followed by the reigning World and GPF champion Patrick Chan of Canada, and Yuzuru Hanyu, also of Japan. Spain's Javier Fernández, fourth overall, won the free skate with a program that included a 4T, 4S+3T, 4S, and 3A. Takahashi won the GPF title in his seventh appearance at the event, Hanyu won silver, and Chan took the bronze.

Japan's Mao Asada took the lead in the ladies' short program, with the United States' Ashley Wagner and Japan's Akiko Suzuki in second and third respectively. Asada also placed first in the free skate and won her third GPF title, Wagner injured herself in falls during the free skate but completed the program and took the silver, and Suzuki took the bronze. Russia's Elizaveta Tuktamysheva was second in the free skate but remained in 5th overall.

Russia's Tatiana Volosozhar / Maxim Trankov won the pairs' short program ahead of teammates Vera Bazarova / Yuri Larionov and China's Pang Qing / Tong Jian. Bazarova / Larionov won the free skate but Volosozhar / Trankov finished first overall and took their first GPF title, while silver medalists Bazarova / Larionov won their first medal at the event and Pang / Tong took the bronze.

The defending GPF champions, Meryl Davis / Charlie White of the United States, finished first in the short dance ahead of the reigning World champions, Tessa Virtue / Scott Moir of Canada, and Nathalie Pechalat / Fabian Bourzat of France. Davis / White also placed first in the free dance and won their fourth consecutive GPF title, Virtue / Moir won their third silver at the event, and Pechalat / Bourzat won the bronze.

Junior event
Russia swept all four gold medals at the Junior Grand Prix Final and the entire pairs' podium.

The United States' Joshua Farris won the men's short program ahead of Russia's Maxim Kovtun and the 2011 JGP Final champion Jason Brown. Kovtun won the free skate with a program that included a 4T-3T, 3A+3T, and 3A. He won the title by 11 points over the silver medalist, Farris, while Japan's Ryuju Hino moved ahead of Brown to take the bronze.

Russia's Elena Radionova was first in the ladies' short program, with the United States' Hannah Miller in second and Russia's Anna Pogorilaya in third. Radionova also placed first in the free skate and won the junior ladies' title by 11 points ahead of silver medalist Miller, who placed fourth in the segment, and bronze medalist Pogorilaya. Angela Wang of the United States was second in the free skate but remained in fourth overall.

Russia's Lina Fedorova / Maxim Miroshkin took the lead in the pair's short program, followed by Canada's Margaret Purdy / Michael Marinaro and Russia's Vasilisa Davankova / Andrei Deputat. Fedorova / Miroshkin were also first in the free skate and won gold with a total score slightly over five points ahead of the silver medalists, Davankova / Deputat, while Maria Vigalova / Egor Zakroev rose to take the bronze, producing a Russian sweep of the podium. Davankova / Deputat were the only junior pairs' medalists to attempt (and complete) side-by-side triple jumps. Vigalova (born 29 June 1999) was the youngest skater at the JGP Final.

Russia's Alexandra Stepanova / Ivan Bukin won the short dance ahead of France's Gabriella Papadakis / Guillaume Cizeron and 2011 JGP Final silver medalists Anna Yanovskaia / Sergei Mozgov. Stepanova / Bukin also placed first in the free dance and won gold by ten points ahead of Papadakis / Cizeron, while the United States' Alexandra Aldridge / Daniel Eaton moved past Yanovskaia / Mozgov to take the bronze.

Senior-level results

Men

Ladies

Pairs

Ice dancing

Junior-level results

Junior men

Junior ladies

Junior pairs

Junior ice dancing

References

External links

 Official site
 Entries
 Starting Orders/Detailed Results
 Senior Grand Prix standings: Men, Ladies, Pairs, Ice dancing
 Junior Grand Prix standings: Men, Ladies, Pairs, Ice dancing

2012 in Russian sport
2012 in figure skating
2012-13
2012-13
International figure skating competitions hosted by Russia
Sports competitions in Sochi
2012 in youth sport
2013 in youth sport
December 2012 sports events in Europe
21st century in Sochi
Figure Skating